Glucuronidation is often involved in drug metabolism of substances such as drugs, pollutants, bilirubin, androgens, estrogens, mineralocorticoids, glucocorticoids, fatty acid derivatives, retinoids, and bile acids. These linkages involve glycosidic bonds.

Mechanism
Glucuronidation consists of transfer of the glucuronic acid component of uridine diphosphate glucuronic acid to a substrate by any of several types of UDP-glucuronosyltransferase.
UDP-glucuronic acid (glucuronic acid linked via a glycosidic bond to uridine diphosphate) is an intermediate in the process and is formed in the liver. One example is the N-glucuronidation of an aromatic amine, 4-aminobiphenyl, by UGT1A4 or UGT1A9 from human, rat, or mouse liver.

The substances resulting from glucuronidation are known as glucuronides (or glucuronosides) and are typically much more water-soluble than the non-glucuronic acid-containing substances from which they were originally synthesised. The human body uses glucuronidation to make a large variety of substances more water-soluble, and, in this way, allow for their subsequent elimination from the body through urine or feces (via bile from the liver). Hormones are glucuronidated to allow for easier transport around the body. Pharmacologists have linked drugs to glucuronic acid to allow for more effective delivery of a broad range of potential therapeutics. Sometimes toxic substances are also less toxic after glucuronidation.

The conjugation of xenobiotic molecules with hydrophilic molecular species such as glucuronic acid is known as phase II metabolism.

Sites
Glucuronidation occurs mainly in the liver, although the enzyme responsible for its catalysis, UDP-glucuronyltransferase, has been found in all major body organs (e.g., intestine, kidneys, brain, adrenal gland, spleen, and thymus).

General influencing factors
Various factors affect the rate of glucuronidation, which in turn will affect these molecules' clearance from the body. Generally, an increased rate of glucuronidation results in a loss of potency for the target drugs or compounds.

Affected drugs 
Many drugs which are substrates for glucuronidation as part of their metabolism are significantly affected by inhibitors or inducers of their specific glucuronisyltransferase types:

References

Hepatology
Organic reactions